Re-Constriction Records released many albums and singles from various bands as well as a number of compilations which were influential in the electronic and Industrial music genres. Below is a complete listing of recordings released by Re-Constriction between its inception and folding. The label dissolved in 1999.

Key

List of releases

Main Discography

References

General

Specific

External links

Discographies of American record labels